Acacia chapmanii is a shrub of the genus Acacia and the subgenus Plurinerves that is endemic to south western Australia.

Description
Like most species of Acacia it has phyllodes rather than true leaves. The rigid, glabrous and pungent phyllodes have a total of eight distant and raised nerves with three nerves on each face when flat. It blooms from August to September and produces yellow flowers.

Taxonomy
There are two recognised subspecies:
 Acacia chapmanii subsp. australis
 Acacia chapmanii subsp. chapmanii

Distribution
It is native to an area in the Wheatbelt  region of Western Australia where it is commonly situated on plains, along the margins of swamps, in depressions and in and around saline flats growing in sandy, clay or loamy soils often containing gravel and over and around laterite. It has adisjunct distribution with populations near Three Springs in the north and around Bolgart in the south where it is often part of heath or scrub communities.

See also
List of Acacia species

References

chapmanii
Acacias of Western Australia
Taxa named by Bruce Maslin
Plants described in 1999